I Am Not Him is a 2013 Turkish crime film directed by Tayfun Pirselimoğlu.

Awards
Best Turkish film at IFF (2014)

References

External links 

2013 crime films
2013 films
Turkish crime films
Films set in Istanbul
Films shot in Istanbul
Films set in İzmir
Films shot in İzmir
2010s Turkish-language films